Battle of Soissons can refer to several battles in the vicinity of the French town Soissons:

Battle of Soissons (486), between the Franks and a Roman successor state under Syagrius
Battle of Soissons (718), between the Neustrians with the Aquitainians against the Austrasians
Battle of Soissons (923), between Carolingians and Robertians during a succession war
Battle of Soissons (1814), Napoleonic Wars
Siege of Soissons (1870), Franco-Prussian War
Battle of Soissons (1918), World War I, between French-American and German troops